Phantom Buffalo is an indie-rock band from Portland, Maine. The band was known as The Ponys until 2004, when both Portland's Ponys and Chicago-based band The Ponys were invited to perform at South by Southwest. Being the lower-profile of the two bands, the Portland group decided on a name change shortly thereafter. The current lineup consists of Jonathan Balzano-Brookes (vocals, guitar), Tim Burns (guitar, vocals), Joe Domrad (drums), Jacob Chamberlain (drums), Sean Newton (bass), and Philip Willey (guitar, accordion, keyboards). The band has released music domestically on the Time-Lag Records label and in the UK on Rough Trade Records. The band's jangly, psychedelic pop music has been compared to The Byrds and New Zealand's The Chills, as well as North American indie-pop acts like The Shins and The New Pornographers.

Discography

Albums
Shishimumu (Time-Lag 006 CD/2LP, 2002) (as The Ponys) / (Rough Trade (UK) 191 CD, 2005)
Take to the Trees (Time-Lag,  July 2008)
Cement Postcard With Owl Colours (Microcultures (France) MM2, 2010)
Tadaloora (Microcultures (France) MM7, 2012)

Singles & EPs
A Hilly Town (Time-Lag 005 7" single, 2002) (as The Ponys) / Rough Trade (UK) 187 7" single, 2004)
Flying Whale Tour EP (Time-Lag CD-R EP, 2004) (as The Ponys)
Killing's Not Okay (Time-Lag CD-R EP, 2006)

Compilations
Greetings From Area Code 207, Vol. 3 (Cornmeal Records CMR2073 CD, 2002) song: "Hey, That's My Only Necktie" (as The Ponys)
Greetings From Area Code 207, Vol. 4 (Cornmeal Records CMR2074 CD, 2003) song: "Nightmare Leaves" (as The Ponys)
Greetings From Area Code 207, Vol. 5 (Cornmeal Records CMR2075 CD, 2004) song: "Bathing Suit For A Rich Girl"
Greetings From Area Code 207, Vol. 6 (Cornmeal Records CMR2076 CD, 2005) song: "Be The Boss"
Maine Tracks (Cornmeal Records Best of Greetings From Area Code 207 Series) song: "Be The Boss"

External links 
 Phantom Buffalo's OFFICIAL website
 Microcultures (EU)
 MySpace page
 BBC review of Shishimumu
 Time-Lag records (US) home
 Rough Trade Records (UK) home
 Cornmeal Records (US) home audio samples of GFAC tracks
 WMPG's Local Motives audio and photos of a 2006 in-studio concert and interview
 Skeleton Media video of a 2005 performance at Space Gallery, Portland, Maine

Indie rock musical groups from Maine
Indie pop groups from Maine
Musical groups from Portland, Maine
Musical groups from Maine
Rock music groups from Maine